The National Association of Local Councils (NALC) is a membership organisation and the only national body representing the interests of local (parish and town) councils. NALC works in partnership with county associations to support, promote and improve local councils.

Established in 1947, by Charles Arnold-Baker, after leaving the Admiralty Division, he accepted a post as secretary of the National Association of Parish Councils. He transformed this body into the union of all rural local councils in England and Wales, the National Association of Local Councils.

NALC is run on a democratic structure. Local councils are members of NALC and their county association. Each county association appoints one elected councillor from their local councils to sit on National Assembly. National Assembly is responsible for the appointment of NALC committees, as well as the management and conduct of NALC.

A local council is a universal term for community, neighbourhood, parish and town councils. They are the first tier of local government and are statutory bodies.

NALC provide a national voice for local councils across England. They campaign on their behalf, raise awareness of their work and provide them with a range of services to support their needs.

They provide several services:

 Campaigning –  lobby for the issues that are important to local councils and communicate those views to the government and a range of influential organisations in the private, charity and public sectors.
 Legal, accounts and audit advice – Written, telephone and digital advice from NALC solicitors.
 Publications – Guides on being a good councillor, employer, finance and transparency, neighbourhood planning and a range of toolkits.
 Conferences, events and training.
 Publicity – Raise the profile of local councils and the sector beyond a regional level
 Media – Guidance on how to deal with a media crisis, how to deal with reporters and media outlets and writing a media policy.
 Standards, awards and recognition

NALC also provides the Secretariat for the All-Party Parliamentary Group on Local Democracy, currently co-chaired by Cherilyn Mackrory MP for Truro and Falmouth, and Richard Holden MP for North West Durham.

The head office is based at 109 Great Russell Street in Bloomsbury, central London.

References

Civil parishes in England
Local government in the United Kingdom
Organisations based in the London Borough of Camden